Barbora Seidlová  (born 23 May 1981) is a Czech actress.

Life and career 
Born in Valtice, Seidlová studied at the Brno Conservatory and at the DAMU department of the Academy of Performing Arts in Prague. Her career was launched by director Karel Smyczek, who gave Seidlová her first role in the television film Romeo, Julie a tma and then chose her for the main role in the film Lotrando a Zubejda.

Selected filmography
 Lotrando a Zubejda (1997)
 24 (2001)
 Snowboarďáci (2004)
 An Earthly Paradise for the Eyes (2009)
  (2013)
 Havel (2020, nominated for best supporting actress at the Czech Lion Awards)

References

External links
 

1981 births
Living people  
People from Valtice  
Czech film actresses
Czech television actresses 
Czech stage actresses
Academy of Performing Arts in Prague alumni
Brno Conservatory alumni